Commander Adama is a fictional character in the 1978 movie and subsequent ABC television series Battlestar Galactica and its continuation series, Galactica 1980.

Adama is the commander of the great military vessel Battlestar Galactica, commander of the refugee fleet, and military commander of the evacuees of the Twelve Colonies. He is also the spiritual leader of the surviving colonists, leading the quest for Earth.

Adama was played by Canadian actor Lorne Greene of Bonanza fame.

In the 2004 re-imagined series a similar character, named William Adama and nicknamed "Husker", commands the Galactica. William Adama is portrayed by actor Edward James Olmos.

Adama's family and origins 
Adama is a native of the planet Caprica, which is where he graduated from the military academy of "The Colonial Service." In a novelization based on an episode of the series, an excerpt from an entry in his journals says that he served aboard the battlestar Cerberus in his younger years and that he named his son Apollo after a friend who died fighting the Cylons.

Adama was married to Ila. The two had a sea-side house on a hill on the planet of Caprica. However, Adama spent most of his married life in space fighting the Cylons, leaving Ila behind on Caprica.

They had three children:
 Their oldest son, Apollo (Richard Hatch), a Captain and fighter pilot stationed aboard the Galactica;
 Their only daughter, Athena (Maren Jensen), a Lieutenant who served in the "Core Command" bridge crew of the Galactica and was also a fighter pilot and a teacher; and
 Their youngest son, Zac (Rick Springfield), a fighter pilot, who was killed in the battle that left the Galactica the only surviving battlestar.

Both Adama's wife Ila and, as mentioned above, his youngest son Lieutenant Zac were killed in the Cylon attack on the Twelve Colonies that caused the Colonies to lose the war.

Soon after the destruction of the Twelve Colonies, Apollo married Serina (Jane Seymour) near the planet Kobol, thereby making Adama step-grandfather of Boxey (Noah Hathaway).
Serina died on Kobol when a Cylon Centurion shot her to death.

Adama considers Starbuck (Dirk Benedict), who is an orphan, a member of his family.

Battlestar Galactica (1978 series)
Adama is central to the story arc of the series, and in some ways the saga revolves around him.

He flew alongside his Executive Officer, Colonel Tigh, in their younger days, and later served with Commander Kronus aboard the battlestar Rycon.

As well as being a career military officer, Commander Adama is also a member of the Council Of The Twelve, the governing body of the Colonies. He, like many battlestar commanders and Colonial Service commanders, was as much a politician as a military commander; evidently, the Colonial Service Academy offered courses in political science and diplomacy as well as military training.

From the start, Adama was mistrustful of the Cylons at the time of the Peace Conference to end the Thousand Yahren War. He was the only battlestar commander to keep his ship on battle-stations drill, and as a result, the Galactica was the only battlestar to survive the Cylon sneak attack. (Another battlestar, the Pegasus, was later discovered to have survived, and to have raided Cylon outposts for a year after the destruction of the colonies. However, it appeared in only two episodes before it mysteriously disappeared, its fate ambiguous.) Despite the destruction and great personal loss, Adama was able to organize the survivors in an escape from the Cylons and lead them on the search for Earth. Indeed, the word Adamah means "Earth" in the Hebrew language. Also, the word Adamas means "invincible" in Ancient Greek.

Adama is a fair and beloved leader, with almost unquestioned authority. He is a deeply religious man, and his visit to the planet Kobol and the Fleet's encounter with the Ship of Lights strengthened his belief that someday Earth would be found.

In the episode "War Of The Gods," it is revealed that Adama has been trained in telekinesis as part of a military parapsychology study at the Colonial Military Institute early in his career. In this episode, Count Iblis can read minds, so Adama also mentions that he has received training in clouding his mind with other thoughts, suggesting that he was involved in experiments in telepathic communication. However, there is no further reference to this in the remainder of the series.

He appears briefly in the Maximum Press Battlestar Galactica comics published in the 1990s, having been put in cryogenic suspension after contracting a terminal illness common to Capricans.

Galactica 1980
Adama was one of the few Galactica crew members to reappear in the sequel series Galactica 1980. His appearance was much the same as in the original miniseries with the addition of a full beard.

Battlestar Galactica: The Second Coming 
A hologram of Adama appears in Richard Hatch's sequel short film Battlestar Galactica: The Second Coming.

Richard Hatch novels 
Richard Hatch's relaunch novels are set considerably after the end of the TV series, e.g. a child of Starbuck and Cassiopeia that did not exist in the series is almost of age at the beginning of the novels. Also the Boxey from the series has grown up and has become a Colonial warrior like his step father (although in this continuity he is also called Troy as an adult, he is not intended to be the same Troy from Galactica 1980).

The novels begin with the death of Adama: "Adama was dying".

References

External links 
 Adama (TOS) at the Battlestar Wiki
 Adama (1980) at the Battlestar Wiki

Battlestar Galactica (1978) characters
Galactica 1980 characters
Fictional commanders
Television characters introduced in 1978